The rufous mouse-eared bat (Myotis bocagii) is a species of vesper bat. It can be found in the following countries: Angola, Benin, Burundi, Cameroon, Central African Republic, Republic of the Congo, Democratic Republic of the Congo, Ivory Coast, Equatorial Guinea, Ethiopia, Gabon, Ghana, Guinea, Kenya, Liberia, Malawi, Mozambique, Nigeria, Rwanda, Senegal, Sierra Leone, South Africa, South Sudan, Tanzania, Togo, Uganda, Yemen, Zambia, and Zimbabwe. It is found in dry and moist savanna habitats.

References

Mouse-eared bats
Mammals of the Democratic Republic of the Congo
Bats of Africa
Mammals described in 1870
Taxonomy articles created by Polbot
Taxa named by Wilhelm Peters